CKJ may refer to:

 Congregation Kehilath Jeshurun, a synagogue in New York
 Chak Jhumra Junction railway station (code CKJ), a station in Pakistan

See also 
 CJK, the set of writing characters in Chinese, Japanese and Korean